Washington Historic District or variations including Commercial or other may refer to:

in the United States
(by state then city)
 Washington Historic District (Washington, Arkansas), listed on the National Register of Historic Places (NRHP) in Hempstead County, Arkansas
Washington Commercial Historic District (Washington, Georgia), listed on the NRHP in Wilkes County, Georgia
 Washington Historic District (Washington, Georgia), listed on the NRHP in Wilkes County, Georgia
 West Washington Historic District, South Bend, Indiana, listed on the NRHP in St. Joseph County, Indiana
 Washington Commercial Historic District (Washington, Indiana), listed on the NRHP in Daviess County, Indiana
 Washington Downtown Historic District, Washington, Iowa
 Washington Historic District (Washington, Kentucky), listed on the NRHP in Kentucky
 Washington Historic District (Washington, Louisiana), listed on the NRHP in St. Landry Parish, Louisiana
 Downtown Washington Historic District, Washington, Missouri, listed on the NRHP in Franklin County, Missouri
 Washington Historic District (Washington, North Carolina), listed on the NRHP in Beaufort County, North Carolina
 Old Washington Historic District, Old Washington, Ohio, listed on the NRHP in Guernsey County, Ohio
 Washington Court House Commercial Historic District, Washington Court House, Ohio, listed on the NRHP in Fayette County, Ohio
 East Washington Historic District, East Washington, Pennsylvania, listed on the NRHP in Pennsylvania
 Washington Historic District (Washington, Virginia), listed on the NRHP in Rappahannock County, Virginia

See also
 Washington Avenue Historic District (disambiguation)
 Washington Street Historic District (disambiguation)
 Washington district (disambiguation)
 Washington (disambiguation)